The Philistines were a people who once occupied the south-western part of Canaan.

Philistines or philistine may also refer to:
 Residents of Palestine (southern Syria), sometimes referred to as 'Philistines' by British writers of the 18th and very early 19th century
 Philistine, a derogatory term for a person deficient in the liberal arts culture
 An elite unit of the South African Defence Force
 The Philistines (Pisemsky novel), an 1877 novel by Alexey Pisemsky
 The Philistines, a 1901 play by Maxim Gorky
 The Philistine (magazine) A periodical that was written, edited, and published by Elbert Hubbard

See also
 The Philisteins (1985–1992), an Australian garage punk band
 The Philistines Jr., an American rock band